The Eastern International League was a minor league baseball league that played in the 1888 season. The league was a Non–Signatory League, with league franchises based in New York and Ontario. The Eastern International League succeeded the International Association. The four–team league folded during the 1888 season, with Kingston in having the best overall record.

History
The Eastern International League formed for the 1888 season. The Belleville, Kingston, Oswego Starchboxes and Watertown teams began play on May 25, 1888 as charter members. Previously, Oswego had played in the 1887 International Association.

During the 1888 season, Oswego disbanded on July 4, 1888 after winning the first–half title. On July 30, 1888, the Belleville team transferred to Brockville. Watertown folded on August 10, 1888, causing the league to fold, with only three remaining franchises.

Kingston won the second–half title and had the league's best record at 25–17, playing under manager Robert Eilbeck, who also served as league president.

Cities represented 
Belleville, ON: Belleville 
Brockville, ON: Brockville 
Kingston, ON: Kingston 
Oswego, NY: Oswego Starchboxes 
Watertown, NY: Watertown

Standings 
1888 Eastern International League
Oswego disbanded July 4; Belleville transferred to Brockville July 30; Watertown disbanded August 10Oswego won the first half standings. Kingston won the second half standings The league disbanded August 15.

References

Defunct minor baseball leagues in the United States
Baseball leagues in New York (state)
Defunct baseball leagues in Canada
Sports leagues established in 1888
Sports leagues disestablished in 1888